Eskilstuna Guif is a handball club based in Eskilstuna, Sweden, which currently competes in Handbollsligan, the top domestic handball league. The club was founded in 1896 as Godtemplarnas Ungdoms- och Idrottsförening (The Good Templars' Youth and Sport Club). They have reached the Swedish Championship final four times (1997, 2001, 2009 and 2011), but lost on each occasion. They also finished first in the regular season in 2011-12 and 2013–14, but were eliminated in the semi-finals in both these seasons. They have played 54 seasons in the top division, second only to Redbergslid, and are fourth in the all-time table of the league.

Sports Hall information

Name: – STIGA Sports Arena
City: – Eskilstuna
Capacity: – 3700
Address: – Arenatorget 1, Eskilstuna, Sweden

Men's team

Kits

Former club members

Notable former players

 Kristján Andrésson (1999–2004)
 Erik Hajas (1988–1990, 1992–2000)
 Claes Hellgren (1974–1978)
 Carl-Erik Stockenberg (1957–1967)
 Mattias Zachrisson (2006–2013)

Former coaches

References

External links
 Official website
 EHF profile
 

Swedish handball clubs
1896 establishments in Sweden
Handball clubs established in 1896
Sport in Eskilstuna